A False Suspicion is a 1911 silent film dramatic short produced by the Essanay Studios. It starred Francis X. Bushman and was distributed by the General Film Company.

Cast
Francis X. Bushman - John Barton, The Husband
Bryant Washburn - Richard Lee
Mabel Moore - Mildred Barton, The Wife
Doris Kelcey - The Little Girl
Kenneth Kelcey - The Little Boy
Eleanor Blanchard - Madame Mantele
Dorothy Phillips - The Model
Dolores Cassinelli - Mrs. Landor's Maid
Howard Missimer - 
Whitney Raymond - 
John Steppling - 
William Walters -

See also
Francis X. Bushman filmography

References

External links
 A False Suspicion at IMDb.com

1911 films
Essanay Studios films
1911 short films
American silent short films
Silent American drama films
1911 drama films
American black-and-white films
1910s American films